Estoloderces luederwaldti is a species of beetle in the family Cerambycidae, and the only species in the genus Estoloderces. It was described by Melzer in 1928.

References

Pogonocherini
Beetles described in 1928